Xan may refer to:

Xan (given name), a diminutive name derived from Alexander, Alexandra or Alexandria, or Galician for John
Xan (vodka), produced by the Azerbaijani company Vinagro
Xan (Baldur's Gate), a companion character from the Baldur's Gate series of computer games
The final boss from computer game Unreal Tournament and sequels
A book by Patrick Tilley on alien invasion
Slang for the drug Xanax
The rap artist Lil Xan
An alternate spelling of Khan (title)
A character from the novel The Children of Men by P. D. James
A legendary and ancient race in the popular MMORPG Anarchy Online

Nicknames
Hypocorisms